Release the Beast is the second studio album by rapper Bone Crusher. The album was released on July 18, 2006.  The first single from the album was "Southern Gorillas".

Track listing
 "We Are" (featuring Twenty, Tezy & Cotton)
 "Stomp By the Town" (featuring Cotton)
 "Lights, Camera, Action"
 "I Do It"
 "Southern Gorillas" (featuring Cotton)
 "Danger" (featuring Tezy)
 "Feel It"
 "Pistol Fo"
 "I'm a Hustler"
 "Mug On"
 "Gotta Get That Money"
 "This One"

2006 albums
Bone Crusher (rapper) albums